Cephalodiscus planitectus is a sessile hemichordate belonging to the order Cephalodiscida.

Distribution
It is found at a depth of 100–300 metres off the island of Jōgashima, Sagami Bay, Japan.

Anatomy
There are three pairs of arms with tentacles.

Phylogenetics
Cephalodiscus planitectus is the most divergent of all Cephalodiscus species, with Miyamoto, Nishikawa and Namikawa (2020) suggesting that it constitutes a sister group to all existing Cephalodiscus species.

References

planitectus
Animals described in 2020